James Blair (September 26, 1786 – April 1, 1834) was a United States representative from South Carolina. He was born in the Waxhaw settlement, Lancaster County, South Carolina to Sarah Douglass and William Blair, immigrants from Ireland. He engaged in planting and was also the sheriff of Lancaster District. He owned slaves.

Blair was elected as a Democratic-Republican to the Seventeenth Congress and served from March 4, 1821, to May 8, 1822, when he resigned. He was elected as a Jacksonian to the Twenty-first through Twenty-third Congresses and served from March 4, 1829, until his death in Washington, D.C., on April 1, 1834.

Under date of December 24, 1833, John Quincy Adams records in his diary that Blair "had knocked down and very severely beaten Duff Green, editor of the Telegraph..." He paid "three hundred dollars fine for beating and breaking the bones" of Green. Adams subsequently characterized Blair as "... an honest and very intelligent man ruined by the habits of intemperance and maddended with opium."

Under date of April 2, 1834, Adams records in his diary that Blair "shot himself last evening at his lodgings ... after reading part of an affectionate letter from his wife, to Governor Murphy, of Alabama who was alone in the chamber with him, and a fellow-lodger at the same house."
He was buried in Congressional Cemetery; his tombstone inscription includes his command as General of the South Carolina 5th Militia Brigade.

References

External links
 , at Congressional Cemetery

See also
 List of United States Congress members who died in office (1790–1899)

1786 births
1834 deaths
People from Lancaster County, South Carolina
American people of Scotch-Irish descent
Democratic-Republican Party members of the United States House of Representatives from South Carolina
Jacksonian members of the United States House of Representatives from South Carolina
South Carolina sheriffs
American planters
American slave owners
American militia generals
American politicians who committed suicide
Suicides by firearm in Washington, D.C.
1830s suicides
Burials at the Congressional Cemetery